The Aspidoceratidae comprise a family of middle and upper Jurassic ammonites that make up part of the superfamily Perisphinctoidea, characterized by evolute shells, commonly stocky, that tend to develop tubercles.

The Aspidoceratidae are thought to be derived from the Perisphinctidae and have been subdivided into three subfamilies, the Aspidoceratinae, Peltoceratinae, and Simoceratinae.

Subfamilies and genera

 Aspidoceratinae Zittel 1895
 Aspidoceras
 Chinamecaceras Cantu-Chapa 2006
 Epaspidoceras
 Euaspidoceras
 Orthaspidoceras
 Peltoceratinae Spath 1924
 Peltoceras
 Peltoceratoides
 Rursiceras
 Simoceratinae
 Simoceras
 Virgatosimoceras

References

 Arkell, et al.,  Mesozoic Ammonoidea. Treatise on Invertebrate Paleontology, Part L (Ammonoidea). Geol Soc of America and Univ Kansas Press.

 
Jurassic ammonites
Perisphinctoidea
Ammonitida families